F.I.S.H. is an outdoor 2009 sculpture depicting a school of fish by Donald Lipski, installed underneath the 1-35 overpass near Camden Street in San Antonio, Texas, United States. The installation features 25  fiberglass resin sculptures of long-eared sunfish, each of which are hand-painted and anatomically correct. One additional fish is displayed inside The DoSeum, a children's museum. The sculpture is part of the collection of Public Art San Antonio.

See also

 2009 in art

References

External links
 F.I.S.H. at DonaldLipski.net

2009 establishments in Texas
2009 sculptures
Animal sculptures in Texas
Fiberglass sculptures in Texas
Fish in art
Outdoor sculptures in San Antonio